Lord Hamilton, Baron of Strabane, in the County of Tyrone, is a title in the Peerage of Ireland created on 8 May  1617, for James Hamilton, Master of Abercorn, eldest son of James Hamilton, 1st Earl of Abercorn, during the life of his father (and his grandfather, Claud Hamilton, 1st Lord Paisley); the barony had the special remainder to the heir-males of his father. He was about thirteen at the time.  Both Abercorn and Paisley were in the peerage of Scotland. He inherited his father's several titles in 1618, his grandfather's title in 1621.

In 1633, shortly after his marriage, he gave his Irish lands to his younger brother, Claud, and resigned his title to the King, to be given to Claud; it was recreated on 14 August 1634 (with the precedence of 1617).

George Hamilton, 3rd Earl of Abercorn, the second Earl's last surviving son, died in Padua, sometime around 1680 or 1682. Claud Hamilton, 5th Lord Hamilton, grandson of the 2nd Baron, therefore inherited the Earldom of Abercorn; the Lords Hamilton have since been Earls, Marquesses, and Dukes of Abercorn, with one exception:

The same Claud Hamilton, 5th Baron and 4th Earl, was Lord of the Bedchamber to James II, went with him into exile, and fought on the losing side at the Battle of the Boyne. Thereafter he was outlawed, attainted and deprived of his Irish peerage and estates; but not the Scottish ones. However, he died in a naval encounter on his way back to France a few months later, in August 1691, and his brother and heir Charles Hamilton, 5th Earl of Abercorn was able to get the attainder reversed, on 24 May 1692.

James Hamilton, 6th Earl of Abercorn was descended from another son of the first Earl, but inherited the Barony of Strabane in 1701 without regrant, under the special remainder. He, who had joined William of Orange in 1688, and fought to defend Derry during the Siege of Derry, promptly had his Irish title promoted to Viscount Strabane.

James Hamilton, second Marquess of Abercorn was Lord Lieutenant of Ireland in 1868, when he was created Duke of Abercorn, and Marquess of Hamilton of Strabane; both again in the Peerage of Ireland. Officially, these were not creations but promotions of his existing Irish titles; this matters because the Act of Union 1800 limited the number of Irish creations after the Union. There is some dispute over the propriety of this action.

Lords Hamilton, Barons of Strabane (1617 to date)
 James Hamilton, 2nd Earl of Abercorn and 1st Baron Hamilton of Strabane ( – ) (resigned 1633)
 Claud Hamilton, 2nd Baron Hamilton of Strabane (died 1638) br. of prec.
 James Hamilton, 3rd Baron Hamilton of Strabane (1633–1655)
 George Hamilton, 4th Baron Hamilton of Strabane (died 1668) br. of prec.
 Claud Hamilton, 4th Earl of Abercorn and 5th Baron Hamilton of Strabane (1658–1691) (attainted 1691)
 Charles Hamilton, 5th Earl of Abercorn and 6th Baron Hamilton of Strabane (died 1701) br. of prec.  (attainder reversed 1692).

For further Barons, see Duke of Abercorn.

References
 Cokayne, Complete Peerage, sub Abercorn, and Hamilton of Strabane.

Baronies in the Peerage of Ireland
House of Hamilton
Noble titles created in 1617
Peerages created with special remainders